Eikeren or Eikern is a long and deep lake in the municipalities of Hof in the county of Vestfold og Telemark and Øvre Eiker in the county of Viken, Norway. It is the largest lake in Vestfold.

At the eastern end of Vestfold is the village of Eidsfoss. In this area, water flows into Lake Eikeren from the Bergsvann, Vikevann, Haugestadvann and Hillestadvann. Lake Eikeren also receives waterflow from the Hakavikelva and Steinbruelva Rivers.

In the western part, Eikeren comes together with the Fiskumvannet in a narrow, strait  known as Sundet. Here water flows into Lake Fiskum,   located at the top of Eikernvassdraget. Through this strait, water flows at an average of 7 m3 per second. From Lake Fiskum, water runs out into  Vestfosselva to Vestfossen. The river then go to Hokksund, where it splits into two river that both flow  in the Drammen River.

Eikeren, together with Fiskumvannet, is 20 km long, up to 2,5 km wide and up to 158 m deep.

In 2005, Lake Eikeren was developed by the Vestfold Inter Municipal Waterworks, (Vestfold Interkommunale Vannverk), in order to provide extra drinking water for Vestfold. The other source is Farrisvannet, a lake on the border between the former counties of Vestfold and Telemark (now united). Vestfold Inter Municipal Waterworks Authority is a company owned by ten municipalities in Vestfold and is responsible for water supply, water treatment, emergency power supply and the main distribution to its members.

During the summer season, Lake Eikeren is served by tourist boat M/S Eikern between Eidsfoss and Vestfossen. The original  M/S Eikern steamer was commissioned in 1861. The steam vessel Cappelen was built in 1880 and was used for timber and passenger traffic. In 1903, the steamship Stadshauptmand Schwartz  carried regular traffic and provided a link between the Kongsberg Railway (Kongsbergbanen) and the Tønsberg–Eidsfoss Line. The current vessel M/S Eikern has carried traffic on Lake Eikern since 1997.

References

External links
More about Eikeren
Map of Eikeren
Vestfold Intermunicipal Water Works
Pictures of Eikeren
M/S Eikern website 

Lakes of Vestfold og Telemark
Lakes of Viken (county)